I Feel Good is the third studio album of Filipino actor and singer Daniel Padilla under Star Records, released on June 13, 2015 in the Philippines. This album consists of thirteen songs including covers such as James Brown's "I Got You (I Feel Good)" in which the album was named, Stevie Wonder's "Isn't She Lovely", James Taylor's "How Sweet It Is (To Be Loved by You)" and Andy Williams' "Moon River". Also included on the album are Padilla's versions of "Knocks Me Off My Feet", "For Once in My Life", "Morning Girl" and "Handog". This album also features his own version of "Ikaw ang Aking Mahal", "Pangako Sa 'Yo", the theme song to his teleserye with Kathryn Bernardo, and "Simpleng Tulad Mo".

Background and development
On June 3, 2015, Star Music revealed the cover of this album. I Feel Good premiered on the international music streaming service Spotify on June 7, 2015.

Music video
The music video was shot on July 5, 2015 and was released on September 11, 2015 and premiered on MYX the same day. The music video debuted at No. 2 on the MYX Pinoy Countdown and at No. 5 at the MYX Hit Chart, then the following week peaked at No. 2 on both charts. The music video for "I Got You (I Feel Good)" ranked #19 on the Pinoy MYX Countdown 2015 Yearender.

Promotion and reception
Padilla promoted the album during the Most Wanted concert. He performed some of the tracks from the album live, including "Isn't She Lovely", "How Sweet It Is (To Be Loved by You)", "Moon River" and "I Got You (I Feel Good)". Padilla kicked off the I Feel Good album tour at Starmall Alabang on August 2, 2015. The tour continued to the Bren Z Guiao Convention Center, City of San Fernando on August 22, 2015.

I Feel Good eventually reached gold status in less than a week. Padilla received the gold record award for I Feel Good from Star Music head Roxy Liquigan and the album producers on ASAP 20 on June 28, 2015. This album peaked at number one on Odyssey Music & Video's nationwide sales reports from July 27 to August 2, 2015.

The album earned a nomination at the 2016 PMPC Star Awards for Music for Pop Album of the Year and Cover Design of the Year. The title track, "I Got You (I Feel Good)" earned a nomination at the 2016 Myx Music Awards for Favorite Remake, while Padilla was nominated for Male Pop Artist of the Year.

Track listing

Personnel

 Malou N. Santos & Roxy Liquigan – executive producers
 Roque "Rox" Santos – overall album producer
 Jonathan Manalo – A&R/audio content head
 Raizo Chabeldin – associate producer
 Jayson Sarmiento – promo specialist
 Jholina Luspo – promo associate
 Marivic Benedicto – Star Song Inc. and New Media head
 Regie Sandel – sales and distribution
 Beth Faustio – music publishing officer
 Eaizen Almazan – New Media technical assistant
 Abbey Aledo – music servicing officer
 Marc Nicdao – photographer
 Ton Lao – stylist
 Ryan Ko – make-up artist
 Christine Joy L. Cheng – design and layout
 Andrew Castillo – creative head
 Dante Tonedo - album master

Weekly charts

Release history

References

External links 
 

Star Music albums
2015 albums
Daniel Padilla albums